Leslie J. Schirato (born 1955), nicknamed “Australia’s Coffee King”, is an Australian entrepreneur and the chief executive officer of Vittoria Food & Beverage (Cantarella Bros), an Australian supplier and distributor of European food.

Biography 
Leslie J. Schirato was born Sydney, Australia in 1955 to Italian immigrants.
At the age of 16, he started working for the Cantarella Bros as a part-time employee over the school holidays, and began working full-time with the company in 1972.

Career 
In 1976, Schirato left the Cantarella Bros to work for David’s Holding and later on he secured a position with Fiat Australia as a sales manager.

After a 5-year absence, he returned to the Cantarella Group in 1981. At this point, Schirato was working in a sales and marketing capacity, and one of his first projects was to introduce espresso coffee to the Australian market.

This was particularly challenging at a time when coffee was viewed as an instant beverage and luxury European coffee like espresso was not highly demanded by consumers. Schirato was laughed at when he tried to promote the company’s Vittoria Coffee brand to supermarkets and many of his peers in the coffee industry said that pure coffee would be too strong for Australians. Today, the pure coffee industry is worth over $135 million and it is estimated that Australians consume coffee at about 2.9kg per capita annually.

In 1993, Schirato was promoted to group managing director and today, Vittoria Food & Beverage supplies over a third of the pure coffee consumed by Australians' in their homes, with Vittoria Coffee dominating in supermarkets as the leader in fresh coffee.

Philanthropy 

Les Schirato is still heavily involved in charitable causes and he is recognised for his community work involving youth, social welfare, health and religion. In 2008, he was awarded with the Member of the Order of Australia for his positive contributions to the Australian community.

Awards 

 Ernst & Young National Entrepreneur of the Year 2001 (Retail, Consumer & Industrial Products)
 Young Presidents’ Organisation International Legacy Honour
 Member of the Order of Australia

References

Living people
1955 births
Australian businesspeople
Members of the Order of Australia